Miglena Angelova Mikhaleva (born 1 August 1968) is a Bulgarian rower. She competed in the women's coxed four event at the 1988 Summer Olympics.

References

External links
 

1968 births
Living people
Bulgarian female rowers
Olympic rowers of Bulgaria
Rowers at the 1988 Summer Olympics
Sportspeople from Ruse, Bulgaria